Moe Kyoe (born November 6, 1947) is a retired Burmese lethwei fighter and first class flag champion, known for his endurance and speed. He was a key figure in changing the match format to usher in the national champions era. After his career as a Burmese boxer he entered monkhood in 1998.

Early life 
Moe Kyoe was born on November 6, 1947, son of U Ngwe Thaung and Daw Ngwe Yin. In a family with seven siblings, he was the fifth after three sisters and one brother. His father, uncle and three of his brothers were or became boxers as well. As a child he followed his brother around to local pagoda festivals and monks funerals to join the kids matches. He grew up on the west side of the Thanlyin river in Hpa-an but due to the Karen conflict his family was forced to relocate across the Mon State border where they settled near Bin Hlaing along the state border, not far from Thaton. His father who had stayed behind was later killed. Thaton was a hotbed and great stomping ground for many traditional boxers in the area and Moe Kyoe's love for the sport only grew stronger.

Lethwei career 
The journey to first class started in Mon State, in particular Thaton, Kyaikto and Sit Taung. For a short period of time he also fought Thais in Myawaddy in the mid-60's. It was actually in Kyaikto where he received his nickname of Moe Kyoe (meaning thunderbolt/lightning), when a travelling circus shared the festival grounds with the boxing ring and an attending member of the circus noted his swiftness in the ring. Ringside judge and announcer U Sein Tin Maung overheard this and promptly presented the boxer with his new name. By 1969 Moe Kyoe was ranked as a second class boxer and hailed as a promising new star.

In the 70's he became a leading and pivotal figure in the sport, winning first class flags against some of the strongest opposition available. His battles with one of the most famous boxers in the person of Tha Mann Kyar are remembered by many. Although no titles were exchanged, his losses to Tha Mann Kyar were used to premiere a national champion over that of a traditional flag champion. Moe Kyoe continued his career for a few more years, into the 80's, until he took a brief hiatus both due to a shortage of competition and the rising economic crisis in the country. After a few years of illegal work importing bicycle tires, car tires and cloth he came back and had one of his last fights against Shwe War Tun, a future long-time national champion and son of the equally imposing Phyu Gyi.

Format changes 
After organisers and promoters started noticing imbalanced competitions in regards to how intensely competitors fought if they were in the same tournament as Moe Kyoe, the trio of him, Kyar Ba Nyein (Myanmar Boxing Federation) and U Bo Sein (Burmese boxer) polished up some of the rules and created a new type of challenge fight. This meant initially that matches would not surpass 15 rounds and that in case of a title challenge judges would score the contest at ringside. These changes gradually led to the naming of a single champion, national or global. And although Moe Kyoe certainly had an equal status to those who succeeded him, he did not carry the title on paper.

Personal life 
Moe Kyoe married once at age 20 but continued his boxing career. He currently lives a solitary life as a monk in the forest near Myaing Ka Lay where he resides alongside the small stupa that carries his name. In his journey to escape from Samsara, after his life as a boxer, he became a vegetarian to comfort his aching body.

Lethwei record 

|- style="background:#fbb;"
| 1980-07-05 || Loss || align="left" | Thaton Ba Hnit || Malun Stadium || Mandalay, Myanmar || TKO || 4 ||
|- style="background:#cfc;"
| 1980-02-05 || Win || align="left" | Yangon Aung Din || 33rd Mon National Day, Thein Phyu Stadium || Yangon, Myanmar || KO || 13 ||
|- style="background:#fbb;"
| 1979-03-19 || Loss || align="left" | Tha Mann Kyar || 32nd Mon National Day || Mon State, Myanmar || Decision || 15 || 3:00
|- style="background:#fbb;"
| 1978-11-06 || Loss || align="left" | Tha Mann Kyar || 23rd Kayin State Day || Kayin State, Myanmar || TKO || ||
|- style="background:#c5d2ea;"
| 1977-02-03 || Draw || align="left" | Tha Mann Kyar || 30th Mon National Day || Mawlamyine, Mon State, Myanmar || Draw || 11 || 3:00
|-
! style=background:white colspan=9 |
|- style="background:#cfc;"
| 1973-01-09 || Win || align="left" | Sakkaw Ma || Kyaikkasan Stadium || Yangon, Myanmar || KO || 1 ||
|-
| colspan=9 | Legend:

References

Living people
1947 births
Burmese Lethwei practitioners
Burmese Buddhist monks
People from Kayin State